Anthony Dwyer (born 1 January 1970) is a former Australian rules footballer who played with North Melbourne in the Australian Football League (AFL) during the 1990s.

Recruited from Westmeadows, Dwyer joined his brother David at North Melbourne in 1990 and played two games late in the season. He and his brother were the third generation of their family to play in the VFL/AFL, following their grandfather Leo and father Laurie.

After not playing a senior game in 1991, he put together 16 appearances in 1992 and kicked 21 goals. Dwyer struggled to break into the team over the next three seasons but in 1995 played in two AFL finals matches and participated in North Melbourne's reserves premiership.

References

1970 births
North Melbourne Football Club players
Australian rules footballers from Victoria (Australia)
Living people